Boris Vladimirovich Asafyev (27 January 1949) was a Russian and Soviet composer, writer, musicologist, musical critic and one of founders of Soviet musicology. He is the dedicatee of Prokofiev's First Symphony. He was born in Saint Petersburg.

Asafyev had a strong influence on Soviet music. His compositions include ballets, operas, symphonies, concertos and chamber music. His ballets include Flames of Paris, based on the French Revolution, and The Fountain of Bakhchisarai, which was first performed in 1934, and was performed at the Mariinsky Theatre in St. Petersburg in 2006.

His writings, under the name Igor Glebov, include The Book about Stravinsky and Glinka (for which he was awarded the Stalin Prize in 1948).

Selected works

Opera
 The Cashier's Wife
 Minin and Pozharsky
 The Girl without a Dowry

Ballets
 The Fairy Gift (1910)
 White Lily (1911)
 Flames of Paris (1931)
 The Fountain of Bakhchisarai (1936)
 The Prisoner of the Caucasus (1938)
 The Rustic Lady
 The Stone Guest (1946)

Orchestra
 5 Symphonies
 Concerto for clarinet and orchestra (1939)
 Concerto for guitar and chamber orchestra (1939)
 Concerto for piano and orchestra (1939)

Chamber music
 String Quartet (1940)
 Sonata for viola solo (1938)
 Sonata for cello and piano (1935)
 Sonata for trumpet and piano (1939)
 Sonatina for oboe and piano (1939)
 Variations for horn and piano (1940)

See also
:Category:Ballets by Boris Asafyev

References

Further reading

External links

1884 births
1949 deaths
Musicians from Saint Petersburg
People from Sankt-Peterburgsky Uyezd
Russian ballet composers
Russian male classical composers
Russian music critics
Russian music theorists
Russian musicologists
Russian opera composers
Soviet male composers
Soviet musicologists
Soviet opera composers
20th-century musicologists
20th-century Russian male musicians
Saint Petersburg Conservatory alumni
Academic staff of Saint Petersburg Conservatory
Academic staff of Moscow Conservatory
Full Members of the USSR Academy of Sciences
People's Artists of the USSR
People's Artists of the RSFSR
Stalin Prize winners
Recipients of the Order of Lenin
Recipients of the Order of the Red Banner of Labour

Burials at Novodevichy Cemetery